Ramon Bautista Bong Revilla Jr. (born Jose Mari Bautista; September 25, 1966) and commonly known as Bong Revilla, is a Filipino actor, television presenter and politician serving as a Senator since 2019, and previously from 2004 to 2016.

The son of actor-politician Ramon Revilla Sr., he himself became an action star in the 1980s and 1990s as Ramon "Bong" Revilla Jr. He started his political career in Cavite, serving as vice governor (1995–1998) and later governor (1998–2001). He was the chairman of the Videogram Regulatory Board from 2002 to 2004.

Revilla was first elected to the Senate in 2004. He successfully ran for a second term and topped the senatorial race in 2010. His alleged involvement in the Napoles pork barrel scam led the Sandiganbayan to issue an arrest warrant against him and other co-accused on June 20, 2014. Within hours, Revilla surrendered before the anti-graft court.

Bong Revilla was acquitted of plunder and released on December 7, 2018, but was required to return to the government  in civil liability. He stood accused of 16 counts of graft for his alleged role in the transfer of ₱517 million (US$ million) of his discretionary funds to bogus foundations until all cases was junked by Sandiganbayan on 2021, however, he has yet to return the required amount he was asked to give back before his acquittal. He later secured a comeback to the Senate in 2019.

Early life and education
Bong Revilla was born as Jose Mari Bautista to actor Jose Acuña Bautista Sr. (known professionally as Ramon Revilla) and Azucena Mortel. In 1977, he finished his elementary education at Jesus Good Shepherd School in Palico II, Imus, Cavite. He finished his secondary education at Fairfax High School in Los Angeles, California, United States in 1982.

Acting career

He starred in a number of action films during the 1980s and the 1990s. In a few films he worked alongside his father, Ramón Sr. He has also appeared in a number of comedy films and television shows with GMA Network.

As a native of Bacoor, Cavite, he made several films focused on his home province.

Revilla's acting career was put onto hiatus due to being arrested for graft and plunder charges. After five years of detainment, he returned to acting under GMA Network. He became part of his drama fantasy series for kids entitled Agimat ng Agila, alongside Sanya Lopez, Allen Dizon, and Roi Vinzon.

Political career

Vice-Governor of Cavite
In June 1994, Revilla became a member of the then-ruling Lakas–NUCD party, which drafted him to be their gubernatorial candidate in Cavite. According to him, it was President Fidel V. Ramos who first convinced him to enter politics and invited him to join the party. However, he was invited by National Bureau of Investigation director Epimaco Velasco to be his running mate instead in the province. In the 1995 local elections, Velasco and Revilla won as governor and vice governor, beating the tandem of Juanito Remulla Sr. and Danilo Lara.

As vice governor, he chaired Cavite's Provincial Task Force Against Illegal Gambling named "Task Force Sugal na Bawal", Cavite Multi-Agency Anti-Drug Council, and Task Force Bantay Likas Yaman. His anti-drug efforts earned him recognitions from the International Narcotics Enforcement Officers Association, Inc. He also founded the Ramon "Bong" Revilla Jr. Foundation Inc. and the RRJ People's Organization Inc., where he served as chairman and president and chairman, respectively.

Governor of Cavite
In February 1998, Velasco resigned as governor of Cavite when he was appointed as Secretary of the Interior and Local Government, replacing then senatorial candidate Robert Barbers. Revilla then assumed the governorship of the province. In the May 1998 local elections, he won a full term for the position of governor.

As governor, Revilla also chaired various civic organizations such as the Cavite Clean and Green project, Region IV Peace and Order Council, Calabarzon Development Council, Cavite Provincial Peace and Order Council, Provincial Development Council, and the Cavite Provincial Tourism Council. He also founded the Cavite Rescue 161, an emergency response unit of the province. During his term as governor, the Cavite Computer Center and the Cavite-Korea Friendship Hospital were established, while projects such as the Cavite Sports Complex and the Cavite Convention Center were commenced. The Proposed Conceptual Provincial Development Plan of Cavite, also called Vision 2020, was also furnished during this term.

He completed a Special Local Chief Executive Program on Local Governance at the Development Academy of the Philippines in Pasig in 1998. He was given the Lifetime Achievement Award by the National Press Club in 1998 and was named as Most Outstanding Governor of Gawad Papuri Awards in 1999 and Most Outstanding Governor of the Department of Health Sandugo National Program in 2000.

During the Second EDSA Revolution on January 20, 2001, Revilla's political career deteriorated when he called for the resignation of his godfather, President Joseph Estrada, who was impeached and removed from office due to graft and corruption charges, at the height of the protest. In his May 2001 reelection bid for governor, he was trounced by then-Representative Ayong Maliksi by a wide margin.

He returned to his acting career and became a TV actor in GMA Network's sitcom Idol Ko si Kap.

Chairman of the Videogram Regulatory Board
In July 2002, President Gloria Macapagal Arroyo appointed Revilla as Chairman of the Videogram Regulatory Board (now Optical Media Board). Revilla launched a massive campaign against the rampant smuggling and selling of fake VCDs all over the country. He was given a Plaque of International Recognition for Efforts Against Piracy by the Motion Picture Association of America on July 23, 2003, and the Huwarang Lingkod Bayan Award by the Consumers League of the Philippines Foundation, Inc. on October 25, 2003.

He also completed his course on Philippine Legislative Institutions and Processes at the Development Academy of the Philippines in November 2003.

Senator
In February 2004, Revilla resigned as Chairman of the VRB and recommended Edu Manzano as his replacement. His father, Ramon Revilla Sr., ended his term as senator on June 30, 2004, upon being term-limited by the 1987 Philippine Constitution as he was elected senator in 1992 and reelected in 1998. He ran for the position of senator under the administration K-4 coalition. He won and received the second highest number of votes from the national electorate.

During the 14th Congress, Revilla was named as chairman of the Senate Committees on Public Works and on Public Services, which he used to push his travel safety advocacies. One of his remarkable accomplishments is the Mandatory Helmet Act, which obliged all motorcycle riders, including back riders, to wear standard protective helmet to reduce motorcycle-related accidents in the country. Because of the said road safety measure, he was named Safety Ambassador both by the Land Transportation Office and Suzuki Philippines Inc. During the 15th Congress, he pursued policies on social justice, travel safety, lower tax, community empowerment and infrastructure development. He also pushed for the passage of his separate bills that would grant wage increase for private sector and government employees.

He was then reelected for a second consecutive term with the highest number of votes in 2010, serving until 2016. On May 29, 2012, Revilla was one of the 20 senator-judges who voted to convict Chief Justice Renato Corona.

Potential presidential bid
Despite the weakness of the Lakas party due to the arrest of former president and Pampanga Representative Gloria Macapagal Arroyo, Revilla assumed the chairmanship of the party replacing Arroyo, and was to potentially run as standard bearer of the party in the 2016 presidential election. On May 13, 2013, the day of the 2013 elections, the Cavite Philippine National Police and the National Bureau of Investigation raided the house of Revilla, and according to Revilla, he was harassed by the group of Sen. Panfilo Lacson and former Gov. Ayong Maliksi.

Involvement in the pork barrel scam

After the 2013 elections, he was allegedly involved in the Priority Development Assistance Fund scam, along with Senate President Juan Ponce Enrile and Senator Jinggoy Estrada, contributing to entrepreneur Janet Lim-Napoles' alleged bogus foundations.

The Commission on Audit, in its two-year investigation released on August 16, 2013, reported on the questionable release of the Priority Development Assistance Fund by 12 senators, including Revilla, and 180 representatives of Congress. A month later, the National Bureau of Investigation filed plunder cases against Revilla, Enrile, and Estrada.

On January 20, 2014, in his privilege speech to the Senate, he criticized the Aquino administration, revealing that he was talked to by the President along with then-Transportation and Communications Secretary Mar Roxas and Budget Secretary Florencio "Butch" Abad to convince him to convict the Chief Justice, Renato Corona.

The Office of the Ombudsman, on April 1, 2014, found probable cause to indict Revilla, Enrile, Estrada, and Napoles with plunder, and filed plunder charges before the Sandiganbayan on June 6, 2014.

On June 9, 2014, Revilla delivered a second privilege speech entitled "Salamat, Kaibigan", as charges were filed against him in the Sandiganbayan. On June 20, the Sandiganbayan issued a warrant of arrest against Revilla and more than 30 others. Revilla proceeded to the Sandiganbayan to surrender, and he chose to be detained at the PNP Custodial Center at Camp Crame, Quezon City.

The Sandiganbayan suspended Revilla from public office and his senior aide Richard Cambe on August 4, 2014, for 90 days. Revilla's bank accounts were frozen in 2015 as a consequence of the alleged involvement in the scam.

His trial for plunder was rescheduled several times due to various motions filed by Revilla. The trial finally began on June 22, 2017.

Acquittal, ongoing cases, and return as senator

In 2018, Revilla through his wife, then Bacoor Mayor Lani Mercado, filed his candidacy for senator for the 2019 elections, with the endorsement of Presidential Daughter and de facto First Lady Sara Duterte, who is the leader of the political coalition Hugpong ng Pagbabago in order to include him to her 14 (later 16)-candidate slate for the Senate election in May 2019, which was criticized by opposition coalition Tindig Pilipinas due to his involvement in the Priority Development Assistance Fund (PDAF) scam with Jinggoy Estrada. On December 7, 2018, the Sandiganbayan acquitted Revilla of plunder in the PDAF scam. He still faces charges for 16 counts of graft, for which he posted  bail. His chief aide Richard Cambe and PDAF scam mastermind Janet Napoles were convicted.

As part of his campaign, Revilla released a campaign video that featured himself and a group of children and his son Jolo dancing to budots. He was elected to the Senate, placing eleventh.

On November 17, 2021, he offered Davao City Mayor and 2022 vice presidential aspirant Sara Duterte the chairmanship of Lakas-CMD, which she later accepted, succeeding him. He later became one of the party's co-chairpersons. Revilla currently chairs the Senate Committee on Civil Service, Government Reorganization and Professional Regulations and the Senate Committee on Public Works.

A Revilla-sponsored Senate Bill in the Philippines this December 2022 is currently proposing to lower the age by which Senior Citizen benefits can be enjoyed, from 60 to 56 years old. Revilla celebrated his 56th birthday September of this year, which he marked with a month-long celebration, which included grocery, cash, and other giveaways.

Personal life
Ramon "Bong" Bautista Bong Revilla Jr. (after his 2009 legal name change) married Lani Mercado (Jesusa Victoria Hernandez-Bautista), an actress and incumbent representative of the 2nd district of Cavite that comprise only of the City of Bacoor, in a civil wedding in 1986. They have seven children, namely:
 Leonard Bryan Bautista (born in November 1986), representative for Agimat Partylist
 Jose Lorenzo Bautista III (Ramon "Jolo" Revilla III, born in March 1988), representative from Cavite–1st, married to Angelica Alita
 Inah Felicia Bautista-Del Rosario (born in October 1989), married to Vince del Rosario
 Maria Alexandra Bautista (1990–1990/1991)
 Ma. Viktoria Gianna Bautista (born in August 1995), married to Jed Patricio
 Ma. Franzel Loudette Bautista (born in October 1997)
 Ramon Vicente "Ramboy/RV" Bautista (born in December 1998), board member of Cavite from the 2nd district

Revilla also had an affair with his ex-girlfriend Lovely Guzman, a non-showbiz personality with whom he has one son named Luigi (born Francis Luigi Guzman in 1992); she would later marry Patrick Joseph Santos, who also legally adopted Luigi, in 1999. He dated her before Mercado. His relationship with Guzman rekindled after he lost his daughter with Mercado, named Maria Alexandra, who died just 26 days after birth due to a heart condition resulted by the use of contraceptives. Mercado chose to stay with him due to his love for him and their children.

Revilla is one of seven children of actor and former Philippine senator Ramon Revilla Sr. and fourth child of Azucena Mortel Bautista. He is the older brother of Strike Revilla, incumbent mayor of Bacoor, and Andrea Bautista-Ynares, former mayor of Antipolo married to former Rizal Governor and incumbent Antipolo Mayor Casimiro "Jun" Ynares III. His younger half-brother Ram Revilla, also an actor, was murdered in his home, and declared dead in the early hours of October 2011. He was 23 years old.

Health
On August 9, 2020, Revilla tested positive for COVID-19 and went into quarantine. His wife and children tested negative. He was rushed to a hospital on August 19 due to pneumonia. He ended his isolation on September 3 as he had recovered from the disease.

Honors and awards

Entertainment awards

Honorary doctorates
Two universities have conferred Revilla with honorary doctorates:
Cavite State University (2005, Doctor of Public Administration)
Nueva Vizcaya State University (2006, Doctor of Humanities)

Filmography

Television

Film

Producer
Alyas Pogi 2 (1991) (executive producer - as Jose Mari Bautista)
Ako Ang Katarungan (Lt. Napoleon M. Guevarra) (1993) (producer - Jose Mari Bautista)
Iukit Mo sa Bala! (1994) (producer - as Jose Mari M. Bautista)
Ang Titser Kong Pogi (1995) (executive producer - as Jose Mari M. Bautista)
Kung Marunong Kang Magdasal, Umpisahan Mo Na (1996) (producer - as Jose Mari Bautista)
Yes Darling: Walang Matigas na Pulis 2 (1997) (producer - as Jose Mari M. Bautista)
Sabi Mo Mahal Mo Ako, Wala Ng Bawian (1997) (producer - as Jose Mari M. Bautista)
Pepeng Agimat (1999) (line producer - as Jose Mari Bautista)
Minsan ko Lang Sasabihin (2000) (line producer - as Jose Mari M. Bautista)

Notes

References

External links

|-

|-

|-

1966 births
Living people
Arroyo administration personnel
Filipino actor-politicians
Filipino male child actors
Filipino male comedians
GMA Network personalities
Filipino Roman Catholics
Governors of Cavite
Heads of government agencies of the Philippines
Lakas–CMD politicians
Filipino politicians convicted of crimes
Male actors from Cavite
People from Bacoor
Bong
Senators of the 13th Congress of the Philippines
Senators of the 14th Congress of the Philippines
Senators of the 15th Congress of the Philippines
Senators of the 16th Congress of the Philippines
Senators of the 18th Congress of the Philippines
Senators of the 19th Congress of the Philippines